Mang Inasal Philippines, Inc., also known as Mang Inasal, (Hiligaynon for "Mr. Barbecue") is a barbecue fast food restaurant chain in the Philippines, established in Iloilo City in 2003.

History

The company was started by Edgar "Injap" Sia II, who owned his first business at the age of twenty. Sia engaged in the food business at twenty-six years of age, opening the first Mang Inasal branch in December 2003 at the Robinsons Mall Carpark in Iloilo City. The restaurant was an instant success, despite stiff competition from other established grilled-food restaurants.

The chain opened its first branches within the Visayan region, then expanded to neighboring Mindanao to the south before spreading to Metro Manila. The company started franchising in 2005. By 2008, Mang Inasal had opened 23 restaurants, with ten being franchised. In 2009, Mang Inasal expanded to over a hundred branches.

In April 2016, JFC (Jollibee Food Corporation) acquired the remaining 30% previously belonging to Injap Investment owned by Inasal's founder.

References

https://www.manilatimes.net/2022/08/18/public-square/mang-inasal-supports-coco-martins-pasasalamat-tour/1855057
https://www.philstar.com/lifestyle/food-and-leisure/2022/07/29/2198857/mang-inasal-selecta-join-forces-share-happiness-free-scoop-ice-cream
https://www.manilatimes.net/2022/07/16/public-square/mang-inasal-marks-july-as-ihaw-sarap-month/1851044
https://mb.com.ph/2022/07/05/mang-inasal-marks-july-as-ihaw-sarap-month-with-meals-for-only-p99/
https://lifestyle.inquirer.net/402649/moms-rule-at-mang-inasal/
https://lifestyle.inquirer.net/398541/make-more-bbq-famoments-extra-special-with-mang-inasal/

External links

Mang Inasal Official Website
Mang Inasal Delivery Website

Jollibee Foods Corporation subsidiaries
Restaurants established in 2003
Fast-food chains of the Philippines
Philippine companies established in 2003
Companies based in Iloilo City
Companies based in Pasig
Fast-food poultry restaurants
Philippine brands
2003 establishments in the Philippines
2010 mergers and acquisitions
2016 mergers and acquisitions